The 1935 Pittsburgh Pirates season was a season in American baseball which involved the Pirates finishing fourth in the National League.

The roster featured five future Hall of Famers: player-manager Pie Traynor, pitcher Waite Hoyt, shortstop Arky Vaughan, center fielder Lloyd Waner, and right fielder Paul Waner.

Offseason 
 December 12, 1934: Leon Chagnon was traded by the Pirates to the New York Giants for Jack Salveson.

Regular season 
Vaughan hit .385 on his way to being named the NL's Most Valuable Player by The Sporting News. It is considered the best offensive season ever by a shortstop other than Honus Wagner.

On May 25, 1935, Babe Ruth of the Boston Braves hit the final three home runs of his career in one game against the Pirates at Forbes Field.

Season standings

Record vs. opponents

Game log

|- bgcolor="ccffcc"
| 1 || April 16 || @ Reds || 12–6 || Hoyt (1–0) || Freitas || — || 27,400 || 1–0
|- bgcolor="ffbbbb"
| 2 || April 17 || Reds || 4–7 || Derringer || Bush (0–1) || — || — || 1–1
|- bgcolor="ffbbbb"
| 3 || April 18 || Reds || 4–9 || Frey || Weaver (0–1) || — || 1,560 || 1–2
|- bgcolor="ccffcc"
| 4 || April 19 || Cardinals || 3–0 || Blanton (1–0) || Hallahan || — || — || 2–2
|- bgcolor="ffbbbb"
| 5 || April 20 || Cardinals || 1–4 || Walker || Hoyt (1–1) || — || — || 2–3
|- bgcolor="ffbbbb"
| 6 || April 21 || Cardinals || 1–6 || Dean || Bush (0–2) || — || 28,000 || 2–4
|- bgcolor="ccffcc"
| 7 || April 23 || @ Reds || 4–3 || Weaver (1–1) || Freitas || Swift (1) || 8,836 || 3–4
|- bgcolor="ccffcc"
| 8 || April 24 || @ Reds || 5–2 || Blanton (2–0) || Hollingsworth || — || 4,036 || 4–4
|- bgcolor="ffbbbb"
| 9 || April 25 || @ Reds || 0–6 || Frey || Hoyt (1–2) || — || 2,590 || 4–5
|- bgcolor="ffbbbb"
| 10 || April 26 || @ Cardinals || 2–3 (11) || Heusser || Swift (0–1) || — || — || 4–6
|- bgcolor="ccffcc"
| 11 || April 27 || @ Cardinals || 8–5 || Weaver (2–1) || Hallahan || — || 10,000 || 5–6
|- bgcolor="ccffcc"
| 12 || April 28 || @ Cardinals || 3–2 || Blanton (3–0) || Dean || — || 12,000 || 6–6
|- bgcolor="ffbbbb"
| 13 || April 29 || @ Cubs || 11–12 || Kowalik || Salveson (0–1) || Bryant || — || 6–7
|- bgcolor="ffbbbb"
| 14 || April 30 || @ Cubs || 0–3 || Henshaw || Birkofer (0–1) || — || — || 6–8
|-

|- bgcolor="ffbbbb"
| 15 || May 3 || @ Dodgers || 1–2 || Mungo || Weaver (2–2) || — || — || 6–9
|- bgcolor="ccffcc"
| 16 || May 4 || @ Dodgers || 1–0 || Blanton (4–0) || Zachary || — || — || 7–9
|- bgcolor="ccffcc"
| 17 || May 5 || @ Dodgers || 9–2 || Bush (1–2) || Clark || — || 13,000 || 8–9
|- bgcolor="ccffcc"
| 18 || May 6 || @ Braves || 8–6 || Hoyt (2–2) || Benton || Blanton (1) || — || 9–9
|- bgcolor="ffbbbb"
| 19 || May 8 || @ Braves || 3–12 || Frankhouse || Weaver (2–3) || — || — || 9–10
|- bgcolor="ffbbbb"
| 20 || May 9 || @ Giants || 1–3 || Hubbell || Blanton (4–1) || — || 6,000 || 9–11
|- bgcolor="ccffcc"
| 21 || May 11 || @ Giants || 4–1 || Bush (2–2) || Schumacher || — || — || 10–11
|- bgcolor="ffbbbb"
| 22 || May 11 || @ Giants || 0–3 || Fitzsimmons || Hoyt (2–3) || — || 40,000 || 10–12
|- bgcolor="ffbbbb"
| 23 || May 12 || @ Giants || 1–3 || Parmelee || Weaver (2–4) || — || 20,000 || 10–13
|- bgcolor="ccffcc"
| 24 || May 13 || @ Phillies || 10–1 || Blanton (5–1) || Bivin || — || — || 11–13
|- bgcolor="ccffcc"
| 25 || May 14 || @ Phillies || 8–1 || Birkofer (1–1) || Walters || — || 1,500 || 12–13
|- bgcolor="ccffcc"
| 26 || May 15 || @ Phillies || 20–5 || Swift (1–1) || Jorgens || — || — || 13–13
|- bgcolor="ffbbbb"
| 27 || May 16 || Dodgers || 0–2 (13) || Zachary || Hoyt (2–4) || — || 6,000 || 13–14
|- bgcolor="ffbbbb"
| 28 || May 17 || Dodgers || 1–7 || Benge || Weaver (2–5) || — || — || 13–15
|- bgcolor="ccffcc"
| 29 || May 18 || Dodgers || 8–2 || Blanton (6–1) || Mungo || — || 8,000 || 14–15
|- bgcolor="ccffcc"
| 30 || May 19 || Dodgers || 9–6 || Swift (2–1) || Eisenstat || Hoyt (1) || 10,000 || 15–15
|- bgcolor="ccffcc"
| 31 || May 20 || Giants || 11–4 || Lucas (1–0) || Hubbell || — || — || 16–15
|- bgcolor="ffbbbb"
| 32 || May 21 || Giants || 4–9 || Castleman || Hoyt (2–5) || Smith || — || 16–16
|- bgcolor="ffbbbb"
| 33 || May 22 || Giants || 2–5 || Parmelee || Blanton (6–2) || — || 6,000 || 16–17
|- bgcolor="ccffcc"
| 34 || May 23 || Braves || 7–1 || Swift (3–1) || Cantwell || — || 10,000 || 17–17
|- bgcolor="ccffcc"
| 35 || May 24 || Braves || 7–6 || Weaver (3–5) || Brandt || — || — || 18–17
|- bgcolor="ccffcc"
| 36 || May 25 || Braves || 11–7 || Hoyt (3–5) || Cantwell || — || — || 19–17
|- bgcolor="ccffcc"
| 37 || May 26 || Phillies || 3–1 || Blanton (7–2) || Prim || — || 10,000 || 20–17
|- bgcolor="ffbbbb"
| 38 || May 27 || Phillies || 2–4 || Pezzullo || Swift (3–2) || Moore || — || 20–18
|- bgcolor="ccffcc"
| 39 || May 28 || Phillies || 3–1 || Weaver (4–5) || Pezzullo || — || — || 21–18
|- bgcolor="ffbbbb"
| 40 || May 30 || Cubs || 4–6 || Henshaw || Blanton (7–3) || — || 40,430 || 21–19
|- bgcolor="ccffcc"
| 41 || May 30 || Cubs || 4–1 || Lucas (2–0) || French || — || 40,430 || 22–19
|- bgcolor="ccffcc"
| 42 || May 31 || @ Reds || 4–1 || Swift (4–2) || Hollingsworth || — || 19,429 || 23–19
|-

|- bgcolor="ccffcc"
| 43 || June 2 || @ Reds || 8–0 || Weaver (5–5) || Derringer || — || 2,973 || 24–19
|- bgcolor="ccffcc"
| 44 || June 4 || Cardinals || 9–5 || Blanton (8–3) || Dean || — || 4,000 || 25–19
|- bgcolor="ccffcc"
| 45 || June 6 || Cardinals || 2–1 || Bush (3–2) || Haines || — || — || 26–19
|- bgcolor="ffbbbb"
| 46 || June 7 || Reds || 4–13 (7) || Derringer || Weaver (5–6) || — || 1,110 || 26–20
|- bgcolor="ccffcc"
| 47 || June 8 || Reds || 14–8 || Hoyt (4–5) || Brennan || Bush (1) || 5,800 || 27–20
|- bgcolor="ccffcc"
| 48 || June 9 || Reds || 7–4 || Blanton (9–3) || Johnson || — || 5,046 || 28–20
|- bgcolor="ccffcc"
| 49 || June 10 || Reds || 14–1 || Swift (5–2) || Hollingsworth || — || 1,186 || 29–20
|- bgcolor="ccffcc"
| 50 || June 11 || @ Dodgers || 4–0 || Bush (4–2) || Zachary || — || 3,000 || 30–20
|- bgcolor="ccffcc"
| 51 || June 12 || @ Dodgers || 7–3 || Birkofer (2–1) || Leonard || — || — || 31–20
|- bgcolor="ffbbbb"
| 52 || June 13 || @ Dodgers || 0–3 || Mungo || Blanton (9–4) || — || — || 31–21
|- bgcolor="ccffcc"
| 53 || June 14 || @ Dodgers || 1–0 || Swift (6–2) || Clark || — || — || 32–21
|- bgcolor="ffbbbb"
| 54 || June 15 || @ Phillies || 5–6 || Johnson || Blanton (9–5) || — || — || 32–22
|- bgcolor="ffbbbb"
| 55 || June 16 || @ Phillies || 4–12 || Pezzullo || Birkofer (2–2) || — || — || 32–23
|- bgcolor="ccffcc"
| 56 || June 17 || @ Phillies || 12–5 || Swift (7–2) || Walters || — || — || 33–23
|- bgcolor="ffbbbb"
| 57 || June 20 || @ Giants || 2–6 || Smith || Bush (4–3) || — || — || 33–24
|- bgcolor="ffbbbb"
| 58 || June 21 || @ Giants || 4–11 || Castleman || Lucas (2–1) || — || — || 33–25
|- bgcolor="ccffcc"
| 59 || June 22 || @ Giants || 5–4 (11) || Hoyt (5–5) || Smith || — || — || 34–25
|- bgcolor="ffbbbb"
| 60 || June 22 || @ Giants || 3–7 || Schumacher || Weaver (5–7) || — || 10,000 || 34–26
|- bgcolor="ccffcc"
| 61 || June 23 || @ Braves || 4–3 || Weaver (6–7) || MacFayden || — || — || 35–26
|- bgcolor="ccffcc"
| 62 || June 23 || @ Braves || 7–4 || Bush (5–3) || Smith || — || — || 36–26
|- bgcolor="ffbbbb"
| 63 || June 25 || @ Braves || 2–7 || MacFayden || Birkofer (2–3) || — || — || 36–27
|- bgcolor="ccffcc"
| 64 || June 26 || @ Braves || 4–2 || Bush (6–3) || Cantwell || — || — || 37–27
|- bgcolor="ccffcc"
| 65 || June 26 || @ Braves || 5–1 || Swift (8–2) || Betts || — || — || 38–27
|- bgcolor="ffbbbb"
| 66 || June 28 || @ Cubs || 0–8 || Henshaw || Weaver (6–8) || — || — || 38–28
|- bgcolor="ffbbbb"
| 67 || June 29 || @ Cubs || 0–1 (12) || French || Hoyt (5–6) || — || — || 38–29
|- bgcolor="ffbbbb"
| 68 || June 29 || @ Cubs || 1–2 || Warneke || Lucas (2–2) || — || 17,400 || 38–30
|- bgcolor="ccffcc"
| 69 || June 30 || @ Cubs || 9–7 || Blanton (10–5) || Root || — || 10,400 || 39–30
|-

|- bgcolor="ffbbbb"
| 70 || July 2 || @ Cardinals || 0–7 || Hallahan || Bush (6–4) || — || — || 39–31
|- bgcolor="ccffcc"
| 71 || July 4 || @ Reds || 9–5 || Hoyt (6–6) || Frey || — || — || 40–31
|- bgcolor="ffbbbb"
| 72 || July 4 || @ Reds || 4–5 || Brennan || Blanton (10–6) || Freitas || 13,000 || 40–32
|- bgcolor="ccffcc"
| 73 || July 5 || Cubs || 4–0 || Lucas (3–2) || Henshaw || — || 10,000 || 41–32
|- bgcolor="ffbbbb"
| 74 || July 6 || Cubs || 8–10 (13) || Warneke || Swift (8–3) || — || — || 41–33
|- bgcolor="ffbbbb"
| 75 || July 7 || Cubs || 1–13 || Lee || Blanton (10–7) || — || — || 41–34
|- bgcolor="ffbbbb"
| 76 || July 10 || Giants || 3–10 || Schumacher || Hoyt (6–7) || — || — || 41–35
|- bgcolor="ffbbbb"
| 77 || July 11 || Giants || 2–4 || Parmelee || Lucas (3–3) || — || — || 41–36
|- bgcolor="ffbbbb"
| 78 || July 13 || Giants || 6–7 || Hubbell || Hoyt (6–8) || — || — || 41–37
|- bgcolor="ccffcc"
| 79 || July 14 || Giants || 4–2 || Blanton (11–7) || Smith || — || 12,000 || 42–37
|- bgcolor="ffbbbb"
| 80 || July 16 || Dodgers || 3–9 || Zachary || Swift (8–4) || — || 2,000 || 42–38
|- bgcolor="ffbbbb"
| 81 || July 17 || Dodgers || 4–5 || Clark || Bush (6–5) || Leonard || — || 42–39
|- bgcolor="ffbbbb"
| 82 || July 17 || Dodgers || 0–5 || Earnshaw || Hoyt (6–9) || — || — || 42–40
|- bgcolor="ffbbbb"
| 83 || July 18 || Dodgers || 3–5 || Benge || Blanton (11–8) || Leonard || — || 42–41
|- bgcolor="ccffcc"
| 84 || July 19 || Braves || 6–5 || Bush (7–5) || Cantwell || — || — || 43–41
|- bgcolor="ccffcc"
| 85 || July 20 || Braves || 14–2 || Brown (1–0) || Frankhouse || — || — || 44–41
|- bgcolor="ccffcc"
| 86 || July 20 || Braves || 6–3 || Weaver (7–8) || MacFayden || — || — || 45–41
|- bgcolor="ccffcc"
| 87 || July 21 || Braves || 7–0 || Swift (9–4) || Brandt || — || — || 46–41
|- bgcolor="ccffcc"
| 88 || July 22 || Phillies || 5–4 || Bush (8–5) || Pezzullo || — || — || 47–41
|- bgcolor="ccffcc"
| 89 || July 24 || Phillies || 8–6 || Birkofer (3–3) || Prim || Bush (2) || — || 48–41
|- bgcolor="ccffcc"
| 90 || July 24 || Phillies || 4–3 || Brown (2–0) || Johnson || Hoyt (2) || — || 49–41
|- bgcolor="ccffcc"
| 91 || July 25 || Phillies || 9–8 || Bush (9–5) || Davis || — || — || 50–41
|- bgcolor="ccffcc"
| 92 || July 27 || Cardinals || 10–4 || Blanton (12–8) || Collins || — || — || 51–41
|- bgcolor="ffbbbb"
| 93 || July 28 || Cardinals || 3–4 || Dean || Bush (9–6) || — || 36,000 || 51–42
|- bgcolor="ccffcc"
| 94 || July 28 || Cardinals || 5–4 || Swift (10–4) || Walker || — || 36,000 || 52–42
|- bgcolor="ccffcc"
| 95 || July 29 || Cardinals || 3–2 || Lucas (4–3) || Hallahan || — || — || 53–42
|- bgcolor="ffbbbb"
| 96 || July 30 || Cubs || 6–9 || Lee || Brown (2–1) || — || — || 53–43
|- bgcolor="ffbbbb"
| 97 || July 31 || Cubs || 2–4 || Henshaw || Blanton (12–9) || French || — || 53–44
|- bgcolor="ccffcc"
| 98 || July 31 || Cubs || 6–5 (11) || Birkofer (4–3) || Root || — || — || 54–44
|-

|- bgcolor="ccffcc"
| 99 || August 1 || Cubs || 6–5 || Swift (11–4) || Warneke || Hoyt (3) || — || 55–44
|- bgcolor="ffbbbb"
| 100 || August 3 || @ Cardinals || 0–6 || Walker || Lucas (4–4) || — || — || 55–45
|- bgcolor="ffbbbb"
| 101 || August 4 || @ Cardinals || 3–4 (10) || Dean || Hoyt (6–10) || — || 17,000 || 55–46
|- bgcolor="ffbbbb"
| 102 || August 4 || @ Cardinals || 5–6 || Walker || Swift (11–5) || — || 17,000 || 55–47
|- bgcolor="ffbbbb"
| 103 || August 6 || @ Cubs || 1–2 || Henshaw || Birkofer (4–4) || — || 16,000 || 55–48
|- bgcolor="ccffcc"
| 104 || August 7 || @ Cubs || 6–0 || Blanton (13–9) || French || — || — || 56–48
|- bgcolor="ffbbbb"
| 105 || August 8 || @ Cubs || 5–9 || Carleton || Bush (9–7) || — || — || 56–49
|- bgcolor="ccffcc"
| 106 || August 9 || Reds || 1–0 || Swift (12–5) || Hollingsworth || — || — || 57–49
|- bgcolor="ffbbbb"
| 107 || August 10 || Reds || 0–2 || Derringer || Birkofer (4–5) || — || — || 57–50
|- bgcolor="ccffcc"
| 108 || August 11 || Reds || 5–4 || Blanton (14–9) || Freitas || — || — || 58–50
|- bgcolor="ffbbbb"
| 109 || August 11 || Reds || 3–4 || Schott || Bush (9–8) || Derringer || — || 58–51
|- bgcolor="ccffcc"
| 110 || August 12 || Reds || 7–4 || Lucas (5–4) || Hollingsworth || Birkofer (1) || — || 59–51
|- bgcolor="ccffcc"
| 111 || August 14 || @ Phillies || 8–1 || Swift (13–5) || Davis || — || — || 60–51
|- bgcolor="ccffcc"
| 112 || August 14 || @ Phillies || 7–4 || Weaver (8–8) || Pezzullo || — || — || 61–51
|- bgcolor="ffbbbb"
| 113 || August 15 || @ Phillies || 1–9 || Bowman || Bush (9–9) || — || — || 61–52
|- bgcolor="ccffcc"
| 114 || August 17 || @ Phillies || 2–0 || Lucas (6–4) || Jorgens || — || — || 62–52
|- bgcolor="ccffcc"
| 115 || August 17 || @ Phillies || 5–1 || Birkofer (5–5) || Walters || — || — || 63–52
|- bgcolor="ffbbbb"
| 116 || August 18 || @ Dodgers || 0–3 || Clark || Swift (13–6) || — || — || 63–53
|- bgcolor="ffbbbb"
| 117 || August 18 || @ Dodgers || 3–9 || Benge || Bush (9–10) || Reis || — || 63–54
|- bgcolor="ccffcc"
| 118 || August 20 || @ Dodgers || 2–0 || Weaver (9–8) || Zachary || — || — || 64–54
|- bgcolor="ffbbbb"
| 119 || August 21 || @ Dodgers || 0–5 || Earnshaw || Birkofer (5–6) || — || — || 64–55
|- bgcolor="ccffcc"
| 120 || August 23 || @ Braves || 7–5 || Swift (14–6) || Cantwell || Hoyt (4) || — || 65–55
|- bgcolor="ccffcc"
| 121 || August 24 || @ Braves || 3–2 || Blanton (15–9) || Frankhouse || — || 2,000 || 66–55
|- bgcolor="ccffcc"
| 122 || August 25 || @ Braves || 9–2 || Weaver (10–8) || Smith || — || — || 67–55
|- bgcolor="ccffcc"
| 123 || August 25 || @ Braves || 6–5 (11) || Lucas (7–4) || Betts || — || — || 68–55
|- bgcolor="ccffcc"
| 124 || August 26 || @ Giants || 10–2 || Birkofer (6–6) || Smith || — || — || 69–55
|- bgcolor="ccffcc"
| 125 || August 28 || @ Giants || 6–1 || Blanton (16–9) || Hubbell || — || — || 70–55
|- bgcolor="ccffcc"
| 126 || August 28 || @ Giants || 9–5 || Swift (15–6) || Parmelee || — || 15,000 || 71–55
|- bgcolor="ccffcc"
| 127 || August 29 || Cardinals || 5–1 || Weaver (11–8) || Dean || — || 7,000 || 72–55
|- bgcolor="ccffcc"
| 128 || August 30 || Cardinals || 9–3 || Lucas (8–4) || Hallahan || — || — || 73–55
|- bgcolor="ccffcc"
| 129 || August 31 || Cubs || 5–0 || Birkofer (7–6) || French || — || — || 74–55
|-

|- bgcolor="ffbbbb"
| 130 || September 1 || Cubs || 2–8 || Henshaw || Blanton (16–10) || — || — || 74–56
|- bgcolor="ffbbbb"
| 131 || September 2 || @ Cardinals || 3–4 (16) || Dean || Hoyt (6–11) || — || 31,000 || 74–57
|- bgcolor="ffbbbb"
| 132 || September 2 || @ Cardinals || 1–4 (5) || Dean || Swift (15–7) || — || 31,000 || 74–58
|- bgcolor="ccffcc"
| 133 || September 5 || Dodgers || 5–4 || Birkofer (8–6) || Leonard || Hoyt (5) || 1,000 || 75–58
|- bgcolor="ccffcc"
| 134 || September 6 || Dodgers || 13–0 || Blanton (17–10) || Zachary || — || — || 76–58
|- bgcolor="ccffcc"
| 135 || September 7 || Dodgers || 5–4 || Bush (10–10) || Benge || — || — || 77–58
|- bgcolor="ffbbbb"
| 136 || September 8 || Giants || 1–3 || Hubbell || Lucas (8–5) || — || 18,000 || 77–59
|- bgcolor="ffbbbb"
| 137 || September 10 || Giants || 3–4 || Castleman || Blanton (17–11) || Stout || — || 77–60
|- bgcolor="ffbbbb"
| 138 || September 10 || Giants || 2–4 || Smith || Birkofer (8–7) || — || 4,000 || 77–61
|- bgcolor="ccffcc"
| 139 || September 11 || Giants || 10–7 || Bush (11–10) || Parmelee || — || — || 78–61
|- bgcolor="ccffcc"
| 140 || September 12 || Phillies || 11–0 || Weaver (12–8) || Pezzullo || — || — || 79–61
|- bgcolor="ffbbbb"
| 141 || September 13 || Phillies || 1–5 || Davis || Swift (15–8) || — || — || 79–62
|- bgcolor="ffbbbb"
| 142 || September 14 || Phillies || 5–7 || Prim || Blanton (17–12) || — || — || 79–63
|- bgcolor="ccffcc"
| 143 || September 15 || Phillies || 5–3 || Birkofer (9–7) || Jorgens || — || — || 80–63
|- bgcolor="ccffcc"
| 144 || September 16 || Braves || 5–3 || Brown (3–1) || Brown || — || — || 81–63
|- bgcolor="ccffcc"
| 145 || September 17 || Braves || 6–4 || Weaver (13–8) || Brandt || Hoyt (6) || — || 82–63
|- bgcolor="ccffcc"
| 146 || September 18 || Braves || 5–2 || Blanton (18–12) || Frankhouse || — || — || 83–63
|- bgcolor="ccffcc"
| 147 || September 19 || Braves || 7–6 || Hoyt (7–11) || Cantwell || — || — || 84–63
|- bgcolor="ffbbbb"
| 148 || September 21 || @ Cubs || 3–4 || Henshaw || Bush (11–11) || Warneke || 39,000 || 84–64
|- bgcolor="ffbbbb"
| 149 || September 22 || @ Cubs || 0–2 || French || Blanton (18–13) || — || 40,558 || 84–65
|- bgcolor="ccffcc"
| 150 || September 23 || @ Cardinals || 12–0 || Weaver (14–8) || Heusser || — || 7,500 || 85–65
|- bgcolor="ffbbbb"
| 151 || September 24 || @ Cardinals || 2–11 || Hallahan || Lucas (8–6) || — || — || 85–66
|- bgcolor="ccffcc"
| 152 || September 29 || @ Reds || 5–1 || Brown (4–1) || Hollingsworth || — || — || 86–66
|- bgcolor="ffbbbb"
| 153 || September 29 || @ Reds || 6–9 || Derringer || Passeau (0–1) || — || 8,021 || 86–67
|-

|-
| Legend:       = Win       = LossBold = Pirates team member

Opening Day lineup

Roster

Player stats

Batting

Starters by position 
Note: Pos = Position; G = Games played; AB = At bats; H = Hits; Avg. = Batting average; HR = Home runs; RBI = Runs batted in

Other batters 
Note: G = Games played; AB = At bats; H = Hits; Avg. = Batting average; HR = Home runs; RBI = Runs batted in

Pitching

Starting pitchers 
Note: G = Games pitched; IP = Innings pitched; W = Wins; L = Losses; ERA = Earned run average; SO = Strikeouts

Other pitchers 
Note: G = Games pitched; IP = Innings pitched; W = Wins; L = Losses; ERA = Earned run average; SO = Strikeouts

Relief pitchers 
Note: G = Games pitched; W = Wins; L = Losses; SV = Saves; ERA = Earned run average; SO = Strikeouts

Awards and honors 
Arky Vaughan, The Sporting News NL MVP

1935 Major League Baseball All-Star Game
Arky Vaughan, SS, starter
Paul Waner, reserve

League top five finishers 
Cy Blanton
 MLB leader in ERA (2.58)

Bill Swift
 #2 in NL in ERA (2.70)

Arky Vaughan
 MLB leader in batting average (.385)
 MLB leader in on-base percentage (.491)
 NL leader in slugging percentage (.607)

Farm system

References

External links
 1935 Pittsburgh Pirates team page at Baseball Reference
 1935 Pittsburgh Pirates Page at Baseball Almanac

Pittsburgh Pirates seasons
Pittsburgh Pirates season
Pittsburg Pir